Michael Ian Grade, Baron Grade of Yarmouth,  (born 8 March 1943) is an English television executive and businessman. He has held a number of senior roles in television, including controller of BBC1 (1984–1986), chief executive of Channel 4 (1988–1997), Chairman of the Board of Governors of the BBC (2004–2006), and executive chairman of ITV plc (2007–2009). Since 2011, he has been a Conservative Party life peer in the House of Lords. In April 2022, it was announced by the Government that Grade would take up his four year appointment as Chairman of Ofcom from May 2022 and would move to the crossbenches in the House of Lords at the earliest practical opportunity.

Early life

Grade was born into a Jewish show business family originally called Winogradsky; his father was the theatrical agent Leslie Grade and his uncles were the impresarios Lew Grade and Bernard Delfont. When he was three years old his mother Lynn Smith left the family to conduct a relationship with wrestling commentator Kent Walton. Grade was brought up by his grandmother, and only saw his non-Jewish mother once more as an adult. He was educated at Stowe School in Buckinghamshire and St Dunstan's College in London.

Career
Grade joined the Daily Mirror in 1960, and was a sports columnist from 1964 to 1966. By his own account (as related on Channel 4 chat show The Late Clive James), the job had been organised by his father. When Leslie Grade suffered a serious stroke in 1966, the 23-year-old Michael moved into his theatrical business. In 1969, he moved to London Management & Representation. Among the artists whom Grade represented were Morecambe and Wise (he successfully negotiated the duo's defection from ATV to BBC2 in 1968) and Larry Grayson.

LWT
Grade entered the television industry in 1973 when he joined London Weekend Television (LWT) as Deputy Controller of Programmes (Entertainment). During this time he bought the scripts of an African-American sitcom Good Times which had an all-black cast. Adapted as The Fosters (1976–1977), it became the first British sitcom to have an entirely black cast. At LWT, Grade worked with both John Birt and Greg Dyke.

After he became Director of Programmes in 1977, Grade commissioned the series Mind Your Language, but later cancelled it. At an event at the Edinburgh Television Festival in 1985, he agreed that the series was racist, and said that "it was really irresponsible of us to put it out". In what was termed 'Snatch of the Day' by the press in 1978, Grade attempted the acquisition of exclusive screening rights to Football League matches. Previously the BBC had held the more desirable rights, but the Office of Fair Trading intervened, and Grade's purchase was revoked. The package of recorded highlights on Saturday evenings now alternates each season between ITV and the BBC.

Also in 1978, Grade managed to place under contract the entertainer Bruce Forsyth who had helped the BBC to dominate the Saturday evening television ratings through the decade via The Generation Game series. His new vehicle was titled Bruce Forsyth's Big Night and was intended to feature all his talents in one programme lasting two hours. The budget was £2million for a fourteen-week run. The new series was considered a disaster, with the press turning against the host, but did achieve an initial audience of 14 million. The Generation Game, with new host Larry Grayson, managed to achieve a larger audience. LWT's Big Night was not recommissioned.

Grade announced at a press conference in May 1979 that LWT had secured a contract with a production company formed by television dramatist Dennis Potter and his producer Kenith Trodd. The corporate association proved short-lived, with both sides having insufficient experience for budgeting drama shot on film, and was terminated by Grade in the summer of 1980. Only three of what had been projected as six filmed plays by Potter were shot and screened. Grade though, was directly involved with some of the playwright's later commissions.

Grade approved production of The Professionals and initiated the long-running arts' programme The South Bank Show.

In 1981, Grade left LWT to begin a two-year period as the president of Embassy Television in the United States. In The Times he was quoted as stating, "It is a once-in-a-lifetime opportunity; it is, if you like, a gamble I want to take". His pay rose from £32,000 to $250,000 per annum. During this time he was largely involved in developing and selling sitcoms in this period: "When you read 30 or 40 comedy scripts a week, you get a bit barking." Grade also produced a series for the only time in his career, a nine-part adaptation of Kane and Abel, the novel by Jeffrey Archer. In a Jewish Chronicle interview with Michael Freedland in 2011, Grade said he had "missed public service broadcasting, real drama, news, current affairs".

BBC
Grade joined BBC Television in early summer 1984, becoming Controller of BBC 1 on 1 September 1984, taking, as he told Michael Freedland, "the biggest pay cut in history"; his salary went down from $500,000, excluding large bonuses, to £37,000 a year. Later he became Director of Programmes in 1986, and managing director Designate in 1987, before leaving the BBC at the end of 1987. His three-year tenure as a BBC Controller was controversial.

Grade cancelled the rights to screen Dallas while fighting Thames Television for the rights to the series (although this decision was subsequently reversed). He cut short the expensive serialisation of The Tripods trilogy, written by John Christopher, because he was dissatisfied with the ratings it had achieved after two seasons. He also considered cancelling the sitcom Blackadder, judging the first series to be unfunny. In exchange for renewing Blackadder, he required that it become a wholly studio-based production on a lower budget.

Grade agreed to commission Dennis Potter's serial The Singing Detective (1986) after a brief meeting with Jonathan Powell, then the BBC's Head of Drama. It was a highlight of this period, but came under criticism from Mary Whitehouse and the tabloid press for its content. Referring to the depiction of an illicit sexual encounter in Episode Three, Grade said: "There are very few people in television drama that you are prepared to trust with scenes like this. But Dennis Potter is one of them".

During his time as Controller, Grade was also responsible for purchasing the Australian soap opera Neighbours for BBC1's new daytime schedule; it debuted on British television on 27 October 1986. He was also responsible for repeating Neighbours, at first exclusively an afternoon programme, in a later timeslot (on the advice of his daughter, Alison, who was annoyed that she could not watch it due to her being at school). This proved to be a successful scheduling decision, with audiences in excess of 18 million for the new 5.35 pm broadcasts. Other successes during Grade's tenure included the debut of soap operas EastEnders and Howards' Way in 1985 and the hospital drama Casualty in 1986. He was also praised by Bob Geldof for agreeing to broadcast the charity rock concert Live Aid for 24 hours.

In November 1984 he decided to end screening beauty pageants, stating, "I believe these contests no longer merit national air time. They are an anachronism in this day and age of equality and verging on the offensive."

Doctor Who controversy
Grade announced on 27 February 1985 that season 23 of Doctor Who, which was scheduled to be transmitted from January to March 1986, would be postponed as he had decided that the programme's budget would be better spent on other drama productions. What became an 18-month hiatus for Doctor Who (the series did not resume transmission until September 1986) prompted a strong reaction from viewers. Grade was also noted for his strong dislike of the series, such as in an interview in 2004, where he said: "I thought it was horrible, awful. I thought it was so outdated. It was just a little show for a few pointy head Doctor Who fans. It was also very violent and it had lost its magic". In an appearance on the BBC's Room 101 in 2002, Grade chose the series as one of his hates, criticised its production values and said that he had little interest in, or sympathy for, science fiction.

Eric Saward, the script editor of Doctor Who at the time of its suspension, responded to Grade's criticism a few years later. In his view, Grade's comments were unfair because he was in the position to allocate more resources to the programme and thus improve its quality. However, actress Katy Manning, who had portrayed a companion of Jon Pertwee's Doctor, praised Grade's treatment of the series on the DVD commentary for The Mind of Evil (1971). In her view, Grade "was actually doing the right thing", and she credited the long break prior to 2005 with rejuvenating the series.

In the autumn of 1986, Grade decided that season 24 of Doctor Who could only happen on the condition that Colin Baker was removed from the title role. Years later Grade stated that he thought Baker's portrayal of the Doctor was "utterly unlikeable; absolutely God-awful in fact". However, his immediate predecessor in the role, Peter Davison, argued in 2018 that the decision to dismiss Baker was more to do with the executives wanting to get rid of the series' producer, John Nathan-Turner, saying: "I was upset about what happened, really – because, first of all, it wasn't to do with Colin, I know that. It was to do with other issues. The power structure in the BBC had changed and they didn't want John Nathan-Turner around is the truth of it."

Following the end of the first series of the revived Doctor Who in 2005, Grade wrote a letter to Mark Thompson, the Director-General of the BBC, congratulating all involved in the production on its success, signing-off with "PS never dreamed I would ever write this. Must be going soft!" In an interview for Radio Times in 2012, Grade commented: "From clunky Daleks that couldn't go up and down stairs to the filmic qualities today of Doctor Who, it's a transformation... The show still leaves me cold, but I admire it, which I never did before."

Channel 4
Grade accepted the post of chief executive of Channel 4, succeeding Jeremy Isaacs, and taking up his post at the beginning of 1988. It was a decision which led Isaacs to criticise the appointment and to threaten to "throttle" Grade if the nature of the Channel was altered.

He phased out some of its more high-brow programming, for which he was accused of "dumbing down". His 1991 decision to axe the long-running and widely admired discussion series After Dark is detailed here. Grade stated that in the same week that he moved to Channel 4, it had shown a repeat of the 1984 adaptation of The Far Pavilions, featuring American actress Amy Irving "blacked up" as an Indian princess. During this period, he was also criticised by the conservative press: Daily Mail columnist Paul Johnson dubbed him Britain's "pornographer-in-chief".

In addition to securing talent from the BBC, he recognised the improving quality of US television output, making series such as Friends and ER the mainstays of the channel's schedule. Grade became involved in a dispute with Chris Morris regarding the satire Brass Eye after repeatedly intervening in the production to order edits to various episodes, and rescheduling some instalments for sensitivity. Morris responded by inserting a frame stating "Grade is a cunt" into the final episode of the first run.

In 1997, Grade left Channel 4 to head First Leisure Corporation but departed two years later following a substantial internal re-structuring. His next job was as the chairman of the new Pinewood and Shepperton film studios company.

Return to the BBC
Grade was on the board of the poorly received Millennium Dome project, and has served as chairman of Octopus Publishing, the Camelot Group, and Hemscott (a position that he intends to relinquish).

He had ambitions to become Chairman of the BBC Board of Governors in 2001, but was beaten to the post by Gavyn Davies. Following Davies' resignation in the aftermath of the Hutton Inquiry report, it was announced on 2 April 2004 that Grade had been appointed BBC chairman; his only demand was that he would not have to give up his job as a director of Charlton Athletic F.C. He took up his post on 17 May.

On 19 September 2006, Grade became non-executive chairman of online food delivery company Ocado. He resigned from the role on 23 January 2013, after which he was replaced by Sir Stuart Rose.

ITV
On 28 November 2006, Grade and the BBC confirmed that he was to resign from his position within the corporation to replace Sir Peter Burt as chairman, and Charles Allen as chief executive, of one of the companies forming part of its commercial rival, ITV. He became executive chairman of ITV plc on 8 January 2007.

During Grade's tenure, ITV has struggled with falling advertising revenue and viewing figures. Upon appointment, Grade announced that his first priority would be to work as a senior partner at ITV Network Limited to improve ITV programming, as well as strengthen its digital channels, ITV2, ITV3, ITV4 and CITV. On 12 September 2007, Grade announced a controversial five-year re-structuring plan for ITV plc-owned regions, selecting entertainment as the top priority. A major overhaul of ITV plc's regional structure was also proposed. The plans would result in the consolidation of the ITV regional news programmes in England, with regions now broadcasting a single service per region rather than multiple, specialised, local services (for example, ITV Yorkshire would no longer broadcast in separate Northern and Southern regions). They would also merge fully ITV Border with ITV Tyne Tees, and ITV West with ITV Westcountry, effectively ending two regions' tenure as independent players within ITV; the proposals have been criticised by BECTU and the National Union of Journalists. Any such changes would be subject to approval by Ofcom.

In March 2009, Grade initiated libel action against another television executive, Greg Dyke, and The Times newspaper over allegations of improper conduct made by Dyke about Grade, relating to his move from the BBC to ITV in 2006. The newspaper subsequently withdrew the allegations and published an apology, admitting that the allegations had no justification.

On 23 April 2009, Grade announced he would be stepping down as chief executive to become non-executive chairman at the conclusion of regulatory reviews into advertising contract rights and digital TV, at some point before the end of 2009.

Peerage

Grade revealed his membership of the Conservative Party for the first time in May 2010. On 25 January 2011, he was created a life peer, as Baron Grade of Yarmouth, of Yarmouth in the County of Isle of Wight. He was introduced in the House of Lords on 27 January and sat as a Conservative until moving to the crossbenches as part of his role as Chairman of Ofcom, conditions of appointment effective from 1 May 2022.

Ofcom
On 2 April 2022, it was announced by the Government that Grade would take up his four year appointment as Chairman of Ofcom effective from 1 May 2022.

Personal life
Grade was appointed a Commander of the Order of the British Empire in 1998. That same year, he published his autobiography, It Seemed Like a Good Idea at the Time, and married his third wife, Francesca Leahy; they have a son, Samuel.

He was previously married to Penelope Jane Levinson (1967–1981) (she later married writer and historian Sir Max Hastings), by whom he has two children, and Sarah Lawson (1982–1991), a film producer.

Grade is a fan of Charlton Athletic F.C.

References

External links
 
 
 Michael Grade InterviewBritish Library sound recording
 BBC News Online: Michael Grade Profile
 BBC News Online: "Grade Goes Commercial Again"
 Daily Telegraph: "Grade Defects to ITV"
 BBC News Online: "Michael Grade is New BBC Chairman"
 Financial Times: Grade's Letter to Staff and BBC Response
 BBC Online: BBC Press Release

1943 births
BBC Governors
BBC One controllers
British corporate directors
Businesspeople from London
Chairmen of the BBC
Channel 4 people
Charlton Athletic F.C. directors and chairmen
Commanders of the Order of the British Empire
Conservative Party (UK) life peers
Daily Mirror people
English businesspeople in retailing
English columnists
English expatriates in the United States
English talent agents
English television executives
Impresarios
Chairmen of ITV
Living people
People educated at St Dunstan's College
People educated at Stowe School
English people of Ukrainian-Jewish descent
BAFTA fellows
Life peers created by Elizabeth II